Goran Janković (born 12 December 1978) is a Serbian former footballer who played as a midfielder.

Early life and career
Janković was born in Belgrade, Serbia, SFR Yugoslavia and started his career in FK Rad. With this team for seven seasons played in 159 matches and scored 18 goals. After that played in FK Radnički Beograd and polish GKS Bełchatów.

FC UTA Arad Arad is obligated to pay monthly 3.000 euro to Serbian Janković, transferred in July 2006, even coach Marius Lacatus does not want him at the team anymore. At the beginning of January, Marius Lacatus announced Janković that he is not part of his plans anymore and that he is free too look for another club. The Serbian midfielder was in tests in Serbia, Ukraine and Russia and negotiated with CFR Timişoara and Unirea Alba-Iulia, but could not find an agreement. Because of that, Janković decided to respect he agreement with UTA, which is valid till 2008, so he returned at Arad, but he was sent at second team, Gloria Arad, from Liga 3. Because he does not have absences at trainings and he respects the schedule, Janković cannot be penalized and his contract cannot be cancelled.

In June 2008 he signed with Bulgarian Minyor Pernik. After 3 seasons at Minyor Pernik he joined Serbian FK Donji Srem on free transfer. In July 2015, as a free agent he returned to his former club FK Radnički Beograd, from the Serbian third league.

External sources
 
 
 

1978 births
Living people
Serbian footballers
Serbian expatriate footballers
FK Rad players
FK Čukarički players
FK Donji Srem players
GKS Bełchatów players
FC UTA Arad players
PFC Minyor Pernik players
Serbian SuperLiga players
Ekstraklasa players
Liga I players
First Professional Football League (Bulgaria) players
Expatriate footballers in Poland
Expatriate footballers in Romania
Expatriate footballers in Bulgaria
Serbian expatriate sportspeople in Poland
Serbian expatriate sportspeople in Bulgaria
Association football midfielders